The Arctic Response Company Group (ARCG) is a group of company-sized units of the Canadian Forces and the Canadian Army. 

In 2007, the Canadian Army was tasked to stand-up and train four Arctic Response Company Groups, in cooperation with the Canada First Defence Strategy.

Roles and responsibilities 
The Arctic Response Company Group was created to support the Regular Force and the Canadian Rangers in operations to ensure security and the protection of Canada's national security and sovereignty in the Canadian Arctic.

Involved units
Arctic Response Company Group members are mostly made up of Reservists drawn from various units from their respective brigade groups. 

The Royal Winnipeg Rifles
The Grey and Simcoe Foresters
The Royal New Brunswick Regiment
Les Voltigeurs de Québec
The Lake Superior Scottish Regiment
The Queen's Own Cameron Highlanders of Canada
The Royal Regina Rifles
The North Saskatchewan Regiment
38 Service Battalion
38 Combat Engineer Regiment
35 Combat Engineer Regiment
1st Hussars
Windsor Regiment

History
The ARCG from 38 Canadian Brigade Group participated in Exercise ARCTIC RAM, conducted by Land Force Western Area and 1 Canadian Mechanized Brigade Group in February 2012. Exercise Arctic Ram 12 took place near Yellowknife, Northwest Territories.

References

Canadian Army